The Redwood City Historic Commercial Buildings is an historic district in Redwood City, California that comprises four buildings constructed from 1859-1912. These buildings include the Pioneer Store, the Bank of San Mateo County building, the Sequoia Hotel, and the Alhambra Theater.

Pioneer Store
Built in 1859 by John Voger Diller, the Diller-Chamberlain General Store is the oldest commercial building in San Mateo County. The building was originally constructed as a general store and later a laundromat, then known as Quong Lee Laundry.

Alhambra Theater
The theater opened in 1896 filling a void between the larger cities of San Jose and San Francisco. The theater hosted operas, plays, musical performances and had a bar that Wyatt Earp visited. In 1921 the Masonic Order purchased the building and utilized the space for their meetings. The building suffered extensive damage during a fire in 2001 but was able to be saved.

Bank of San Mateo County
The Bank of San Mateo County building was completed in 1900, the second location for the First National Bank of San Mateo County, and survived the 1906 earthquake. The bank which was originally established in 1891 eventually merged with Wells Fargo Bank in the 1970s. The bank printed a variety of National Bank Notes during its operational years.

Sequoia Hotel
The hotel was constructed in 1912, on the site of the former Eureka Brewery which burned down in October 1902. In 1916, it was claimed to be, "the finest hotel now in operation between San Francisco and San Jose." However, in current years despite efforts to revitalize the surrounding area and hotel it houses low-income residents rather than hotel guests.

Gallery

See also

San Mateo County History Museum
Lathrop House (Redwood City, California)
National Register of Historic Places listings in San Mateo County, California

References

External links

Brochure of Redwood City Path of History
HMDB for historic district

Redwood City, California
National Register of Historic Places in San Mateo County, California
Historic districts on the National Register of Historic Places in California
Italianate architecture in California
Neoclassical architecture in California
Renaissance Revival architecture in California